Hopewell is an unincorporated community in Warren County, in the U.S. state of Missouri.

History
Hopewell was originally called "Hopewell Academy", and under the latter name was laid out in 1876.
  The original name is somewhat of a misnomer, since there was no academy near the town site. A post office called Hopewell Academy was established in 1863, and remained in operation until 1906.

References

Unincorporated communities in Warren County, Missouri
Unincorporated communities in Missouri